Younes Sarmasti (born 4 April 1994 in Malekan, East Azerbaijan) is an Iranian freestyle wrestler. He won a bronze in the Asian Championships 2015. Sarmasti also won a gold medal in Junior Worlds 2013 and Takhti Cup 2015.

Sporting career

Wrestling World Cup 

 : Iran, Kermanshah, 2017

FISU World University Championships 

 : Turkey, Çorum, 2016

Asian Championships 

 : Qatar, Doha, 2015

World Junior Championships 

 , Hungary, Budapest, 2011 
 , Bulgaria, Sofia, 2013

Asian Junior Championships 

 , Thailand, Pattaya, 2011

Takhti Cup 

: Kermanshah, 2014 
 : Tehran, 2015 
 : Mashhad, 2016

Dmitry Korkin International Tournament 

 : Russia, Yakutsk, 2014 
 : Russia, Yakutsk, 2016

See also
 Iran national freestyle wrestling athletes

References

External links 

 

Living people
People from Malekan
1994 births
University of Tabriz alumni
Iranian male sport wrestlers
Asian Wrestling Championships medalists